This is a list of airports in Spain, sorted by location.

Airports in Peninsular Spain

Airports in the Balearic Islands

Airports in the Canary Islands

Airports

Heliports

Airports in Ceuta and Melilla

Spain's busiest airports (2016)

See also 
 Enaire (national entity)
 List of ports in Spain
 Transport in Spain
 List of airports by ICAO code: L#LE – Spain
 List of airports by ICAO code: G#GC - Canary Islands (Spain)
 List of airports by ICAO code: G#GE - Ceuta and Melilla (Spain)''
 Wikipedia: WikiProject Aviation/Airline destination lists: Europe#Spain

References 
 Great Circle Mapper: 124 Airports in Spain, reference for airport codes

Footnotes

Spain
 
 
Spain